Three Japanese destroyers have been named Takanami:
 , a Yūgumo-class destroyer of the Imperial Japanese Navy during World War II

Japan Maritime Self-Defense Force ship names
Japanese Navy ship names